BC Krasnye Krylya was a Russian professional basketball club from the city of Samara, Russia.

History
Krasnye Krylya played in the 2009–10 season of the Russian Super League 1, as a replacement for the  bankrupt club, CSK VVS, that is also from Samara.

After the 2014–15 season, BC Krasnye Krylia withdrew from the VTB United League, because it didn't fulfill arena requirements.

Roster

Trophies
EuroChallenge
Champions (1): 2012–13
Runner-up (1): 2009–10 
Russian Cup
Champions (2): 2011–12, 2012–13

Season by season

Notable players

 Gerald Green 1 season: 2010–11
 DeJuan Blair 1 season: 2011
 Brion Rush 2 seasons: 2010–12
 Tre Simmons 1 season: 2012–13

Head coaches
 Stanislav Yeryomin 1 season: 2010–2011
 Sergei Bazarevich 3 seasons: 2011–2014

External links

Official site 
Eurobasket.com Team Info

Defunct basketball teams in Russia
Sport in Samara, Russia
Basketball teams established in 2009
Basketball teams disestablished in 2015
2009 establishments in Russia
2015 disestablishments in Russia